The 1998 Oklahoma Sooners football team represented the University of Oklahoma during the 1998 NCAA Division I-A football season.  The Sooners went 3-5 in Big 12 Conference play, and 5-6 overall. As of the  2022 season, this was the last time the Sooners failed to qualify for a bowl game. They played their home games at Oklahoma Memorial Stadium and participated as members of the Big 12 Conference in the South Division. It was John Blake's final season as head coach as he was fired after the end of the regular season and was replaced by Florida defensive coordinator Bob Stoops.

Schedule

Roster

Postseason

Awards

 All-Big 12: DT Kelly Gregg

1999 NFL Draft

The 1999 NFL Draft was held at the Theatre at Madison Square Garden in New York City on April 17–18, 1999. The following Oklahoma players were either selected or signed as free agents following the draft.

References

Oklahoma
Oklahoma Sooners football seasons
Oklahoma Sooners football